Nasser Kanaani is an Iranian diplomat and the 13th spokesman of the Ministry of Foreign Affairs of Iran since June 27, 2022. He was also the head of Iran's interests protection office in Cairo from July 2018 to July 2022. Nasser Kanaani previously held positions such as the head of the Iraqi staff of the Ministry of Foreign Affairs, the deputy director of the Arab Middle East and North Africa Department and the Iranian embassy in Jordan. Besides his native Persian, he is fluent in English and Arabic.

References

External links 
 

Living people
Iranian politicians
Year of birth missing (living people)